Adil Haider is a Pakistani–American trauma surgeon, public health researcher and the Dean of medical college at the Aga Khan University. He is also the co-founder of Doctella, an online application to enhance doctor-patient communication.

Haider pioneered the work on racial disparities in trauma care and is considered one of the experts in inequities related to healthcare in the United States. In 2017, he was awarded the Ellis Island Medal of Honor for his medical expertise and service to the "less fortunate".

Early life and education 
Haider was born in Zanesville, Ohio and is of Pakistani descent. His parents moved to the U.S. in the 1960s. In the early 1980s, they returned to Pakistan as they wanted to "give back" to the country. Haider completed his schooling at St. Patrick's High School in Karachi and then pursued medical school at the Aga Khan University, graduating as a doctor in 1998. According to Haider, he was first drawn to the medical profession when he was six years old, inspired by the television series Trapper John, M.D..

Medical practice 
Adil Haider is a board-certified trauma and acute care surgeon. After obtaining his medical degree at the Aga Khan University Medical College, he moved to the U.S. to pursue postgraduate studies. He trained in public health at the Johns Hopkins Bloomberg School of Public Health and received his M.P.H. in 2000. He then went on to complete his surgical training at New York Medical College in 2005 and later joined the Johns Hopkins School of Medicine, where he competed his fellowships in surgical critical care (2006) and trauma and acute care surgery (2007).

From 2007 to 2014, Haider worked at the Johns Hopkins Hospital as a trauma and critical care surgeon. He then went on to becoming the Kessler director of the Center of Surgery and Public Health at the Brigham and Women’s Hospital from 2015 to 2018. He is currently affiliated with the Aga Khan University medical college.

Academic Appointments
Dean of Medical College at the Aga Khan University, Karachi, Pakistan. (2018-Present)
Director of Disparities and Emerging Trauma Systems at the Brigham and Women's Hospital, Boston, MA, USA. (2018-Present)
President of the Association for Academic Surgery (AAS). (2018)
Recorder and Program Committee Chair for Association for Academic Surgery (AAS) (2015–Present)
Deputy Editor for JAMA Surgery. (2015–Present)
Kessler Director for the Center for Surgery and Public Health (CSPH), Boston, MA, USA. (2014–2018)
Surgical Education Chair and Executive Council Member for Society of University Surgeons (SUS). (2014–Present)
Co-Director for the Howard-Hopkins Surgical Outcomes Collaborative, Washington, DC, USA. (2008–Present)
Director for the Center for Surgery Trials and Outcomes Research (CSTOR), Baltimore, MD, USA. (2012-2014).
Associate Professor of Surgery, Anesthesiology and Critical Care Medicine at Johns Hopkins University School of Medicine, Baltimore, MD, USA. (2011-2014).

Awards
Recipient of the Ellis Island Medal of Honor in 2017.
Recipient of Diversity Leadership Award in 2014 from President, Johns Hopkins University.
Recipient of Joan L. and Julius H. Jacobson II Promising Investigator Award from American College of Surgeons, in 2013.
Recipient of International Surgical Week First Prize from International Association for the Surgery of Trauma and Intensive Care (IATSIC), in 2013.
Recipient of C. James Carrico Fellowship from the American College of Surgeons, in 2011.

References 

1973 births
Aga Khan University alumni
American emigrants to Pakistan
American medical writers
American physicians of Pakistani descent
American surgeons
Johns Hopkins School of Medicine alumni
Living people
New York Medical College alumni
People from Boston
People from Karachi
St. Patrick's High School, Karachi alumni
Academic staff of Aga Khan University
Pakistani surgeons
Pakistani medical writers